William Steuart may refer to:

Scotland
William Steuart (British Army officer) (1643–1726), Scottish general
William Steuart (Scottish politician) (1686–1768), Scottish lawyer, member of parliament 1713–41

Maryland
William Frederick Steuart 1816–1889 (1816–1889), Confederate surgeon
William Steuart (Mayor of Baltimore) (1754–1838), mayor of Baltimore
William Steuart (planter) (1754–1838), Maryland planter

See also
Billy Steuart (born 1936), South African swimmer
William Stewart (disambiguation)
William Stuart (disambiguation)